Virtual Pro Wrestling 64 is a professional wrestling video game released in 1997 on the Nintendo 64 game console and the second game in the Virtual Pro Wrestling series. The game is a sequel to the original Virtual Pro Wrestling released in 1996 exclusively for the PlayStation. The game was only released in Japan, and is the Japanese counterpart to WCW vs. nWo: World Tour. The game features wrestlers from World Championship Wrestling, but also includes generic renditions of wrestlers from major Japanese promotions such as New Japan Pro-Wrestling and All Japan Pro Wrestling, a feature that would continue following the release of the sequel Virtual Pro Wrestling 2. VPW 64 was succeeded by Virtual Pro Wrestling 2: Ōdō Keishō, which was released on the Nintendo 64 in 2000.

Differences from WCW vs. nWo: World Tour
Although released less than a month after its American counterpart, Virtual Pro Wrestling 64 has various distinctions from and additions to World Tour. For example, most wrestlers sport their actual attires but occasionally they may contain color alterations as is the case with Hulk Hogan's famous yellow tights and red knee pads which are replaced with yellow tights and black knee pads and with Chris Benoit, who sports his Japanese attires as opposed to his Four Horsemen attire which he wears in World Tour. Along with other sporadic attire color coordination changes, some wrestler's actual movesets are sometimes altered as well. For instance, with Chris Benoit's Front Special move, he performs a double German suplex which is entirely absent from World Tour and Diamond Dallas Page, who needs not be unlocked as required World Tour (along with Randy Savage), performs his signature Diamond Cutter simply as a strong grapple move and instead has a T-bone suplex for his front Special. Other unlockable wrestlers in World Tour that are entirely absent from VPW 64, include Glacier and Wrath.

Notably, VPW 64 also includes a post-match scoring system as well as the ability to edit wrestlers' attire. These features would not be introduced to American gamers until WCW/nWo Revenge in 1998.

Roster
Note People featured on the same line indicate that they are featured on the same slot as an alternative attire or can be accessed through pressing the Z button.

Wrestling Legends

World Championship Wrestling

New World Order

Neo Strong Wrestling (New Japan Pro-Wrestling)

Empire Wrestling Federation (All Japan Pro Wrestling)

Wrestle of Universe (UWF International, Fighting Network RINGS, Pancrase)

Dead or Alive Wrestling (Frontier Martial Arts Wrestling)

Independent Local Wrestling (Michinoku Pro Wrestling)

See also

 WCW vs. nWo: World Tour
 Virtual Pro Wrestling 2: Ōdō Keishō
 Virtual Pro-Wrestling (PlayStation)

References

1997 video games
Asmik Ace Entertainment games
Japan-exclusive video games
Nintendo 64 games
Nintendo 64-only games
Virtual Pro Wrestling games
Syn Sophia games
Video games developed in Japan
World Championship Wrestling video games